Deir Ful (also spelled Derful) is a village in northern Syria, administratively part of the Homs Governorate, located northeast of Homs. Nearby localities include al-Rastan to the west, al-Zaafaraniyah to the southwest, al-Mishirfeh and Ayn al-Niser to the south, Danibah and Khunayfis to the east, Izz al-Din to the northeast and Ghor al-Assi to the northwest. According to the Syria Central Bureau of Statistics (CBS), Deir Ful had a population of 1,614 in the 2004 census. Its inhabitants are predominantly Circassians.

History 
The village was established in 1878–1880 by Kumyk emigrants (muhajirs) from the Northern Caucasian Dagestan, settlements of Utamish, Bashlykent and Karabudaghkent,  later joined by Kumyks from the Kumyk possession of the Russian Empire and many other Dagestan people.

References

Kumyks
Populated places in al-Rastan District
Circassian communities in Syria